Braytown is an unincorporated community in Anderson County, in the U.S. state of Tennessee.

History
The community was named for the Bray family, who settled there in the early 19th century or earlier.

References

Unincorporated communities in Anderson County, Tennessee
Unincorporated communities in Tennessee